The Marui Big Bear Datsun (MT-59-RC-4) was an early 1/12-scale electric "monster truck" radio controlled car manufactured and distributed by Japanese hobby and airsoft gun manufacturer Tokyo Marui.

Background
Originally sold only through mail order in 1984 as a kit without batteries, radio and charger, the Big Bear featured a plastic, tub-styled chassis, Mabuchi M480-RS motor, mechanical speed control and live axle rear suspension as opposed to an independent setup.  Tires were wide, chevron-treaded implement-styled units and actually comprised the majority of the Big Bear's suspension.  The shock absorbers were simple coilover units which allowed for limited suspension travel.  Coil springs also served to hold the front bumper in place and absorb impact.  The body was a highly detailed styrene plastic Datsun pickup with driver figure and "Big Bear" decal set.

Because of its low cost, ease of assembly and good factory and aftermarket support, the Big Bear played an important role in the early growth of the radio control hobby.  Due to intense competition from Tamiya and somewhat brittle plastic, Tokyo Marui pulled completely out of the hobby market by the end of the decade.

The 'Big Bear' was sold in Australia as a complete kit, including radio transmitter, batteries, and charger.

Kit Revisions
Owners of the original version (v.1) of the Big Bear experienced problems with its differential gears.  This kit used the same gearboxes and gears as the Marui Jeep CJ (MT-59-RC-7) and the Marui Toyota Landcruiser (MT-59-RC-8) kits and consisted of 2 large bevel gears, and a gear set of 48 pitch metric. This proved to be a major problem for the first version of the Big Bear, as the special black M480RS motor and the large tires designed for the Big Bear created increased load, causing the differential gears to break or heat up and melt.

Marui made a special replacement part "#048 - Strengthened Differential Gear Set" that consisted of a tri-bevel differential, larger 32 pitch gears, and a change to the gear ratios.  This new differential gear set found its way into the re-release of the Big Bear (v.2) coupled with a new heat sink plate between the gearbox halves. There were some draw backs to the new gears; The added torque of the new gear ratios made the truck do wheelies more easily, and made the truck a little slower. In addition to replacement gears and heat sink, Marui replaced the original M480-RS motor with an RS540-SH motor, and a redesigned mechanical speed controller with covered contacts to eliminate contamination.

Specifications
Scale:  1/12
Chassis construction:  ABS resin tub-style
Transmission:  Rear wheel drive with differential
Suspension:  Independent front trailing arm and live axle rear suspension
Shock absorbers:  Simple coilover
Motor:  Mabuchi RS-540 (v.1) / RS-540SH (v.2)
Tires:  Semi-pneumatic rubber chevron
Original Marui catalog number:  MT-59-RC-4

Spare Parts List
The following Marui RC Parts were used for the Big Bear, as well as other Marui kits:

Aftermarket Parts
Many supporting manufacturers developed products for the Big Bear.  Here is a list of known aftermarket parts designed specifically for this kit:

References

External links
The CJ3B Page.

Radio-controlled cars